The 2019 Monza FIA Formula 2 round was a pair of motor races held on 7 and 8 September 2019 at the Autodromo Nazionale di Monza in Monza, Italy as part of the FIA Formula 2 Championship. It was the ninth round of the 2019 FIA Formula 2 Championship and was run in support of the 2019 Italian Grand Prix.

Aftermath of Spa incident
After the aborted attempt to conduct races at Spa-Francorchamps abandoned following a multiple-car pileup that killed Anthoine Hubert (BWT Arden) and seriously injured Juan Manuel Correa (Sauber Junior Team by Charouz) that also involved Giuliano Alesi (Trident), whose car was impounded by authorities as part of the crash investigation, all three teams ran one car, meaning Tatiana Calderón (Arden) and Callum Ilott (Charouz) would be the only cars for their team, while Trident benched Ralph Boschung for Alesi, who was not injured in the crash.

Classification

Qualifying

Notes
  – Nyck de Vries was excluded from the qualifying results due to fuel infringement.

Feature Race 

Notes
  – Guanyu Zhou has been handed a three-place grid drop Sprint Race, following a collision with Nicholas Latifi.

Sprint Race

Championship standings after the round

Drivers' Championship standings

Teams' Championship standings

References

External links
 

Monza
Monza